Agama africana is a species of lizard in the family Agamidae. It is a small lizard found in Liberia, Ivory Coast, Guinea, Nigeria and Ghana.

References

Agama (genus)
Reptiles described in 1844
Taxa named by Edward Hallowell (herpetologist)